Kinobe is a British music act. It was founded in west London in 1998 by childhood friends Mark Blackburn and Julius Waters.  Blackburn departed in 2004, replaced by Dave Pemberton. Chuck Norman replaces Pemberton for their 2017 releases.

Kinobe first came to prominence with their single "Slip Into Something More Comfortable" (sampling Engelbert Humperdinck's "From Here to Eternity") during the late 1990s/early 2000s boom for chilled electronic music, alongside Lemon Jelly, Bonobo and Bent. The track featured on numerous TV, film and compilation soundtracks and was reissued in 2016 with new remixes featuring Psychemagik, Stephen Hague, Shibumi and Enginearz.

Kinobe followed up the success of the single with a series of albums that featured continued use of sampling and live instruments, while also introducing guest vocalists

In May 2017, they released The Firebird EP. The title track was accompanied by a vintage skateboarding video, featuring legendary Seventies downhill speed champ, Guy ‘Grundy’ Spagnoli.

A further EP, Thought It Was You EP, was released in July 2017, comprising four new songs: the title track featuring vocals from the Donny Hathaway-esque songwriter Rich Hale, "Summer Rain" sung by model and songwriter Lucy Chapman, and two instrumentals "Sunray" and "Watch The Skies". The video for the latter contained edited sections of a General Motors promotional video 'Designed for Dreaming'

Discography

Studio albums

References

External links
 
 Kinobe on YouTube
 Kinobe at discogs.com
 Website

English electronic music duos
Trip hop groups